Eden Francis (born 19 October 1988 in Leicester) is an English female athlete who competes in the shot put and discus. She has personal best distances of 17.24 metres and 59.78 metres respectively in these events.

Athletics career
Francis competed in both events at the 2014 Commonwealth Games in Glasgow, Scotland finishing 6th in the shot put and 7th in the discus.

She was the first British (male or female) athlete to win the discus event at the European Athletics U23 Championships, winning in Kaunus, Lithuania in 2009. This also represented Britain's first ever gold medal for a female discus thrower at European, World or Olympic level. Her gold medal was subsequently stolen during a burglary at her home.

She has been British champion eight times. Twice were indoors with the shot put in 2008 and 2015. The other six British titles were won outdoors with the discus in 2012 and 2014 and the shot put in 2009, 2010, 2012 and 2014. She is also the British under 20 record holder in the discus.

References

1988 births
Living people
Sportspeople from Leicester
British female discus throwers
British female shot putters
English female discus throwers
English female shot putters
Commonwealth Games competitors for England
Athletes (track and field) at the 2014 Commonwealth Games
British Athletics Championships winners